Tortona Cathedral is a Catholic cathedral in Tortona, Piedmont, Italy, dedicated to the Assumption of the Virgin Mary and Saint Lawrence. It is the episcopal seat of the Diocese of Tortona.

References

Roman Catholic cathedrals in Italy
Churches in Tortona
Cathedrals in Piedmont